Kerry Jeff Sulkowicz (born 1958) is an American psychiatrist and psychoanalyst. A clinical professor of psychiatry at NYU Langone Medical Center, Sulkowicz is the founder and managing principal of Boswell Group LLC, which advises boards of directors, CEOs, and other executives on the psychology of leadership. A profile in Psychiatric Times described him in 2014 as "one of the most sought after psychoanalysts in the world."

Education 
Born in Texas, Sulkowicz graduated from the St. Mark's School of Texas in 1977. He earned an AB from Harvard University and his MD from the University of Texas Medical Branch in 1985. He completed his residency in psychiatry at New York University in 1989 and was certified by the American Board of Psychiatry and Neurology in 1991. He also completed psychoanalytic training at the NYU Psychoanalytic Institute in 1992.

Career

After spending several years in clinical practice, Sulkowicz pursued a career in business consulting and in 1998 founded Boswell Group in New York. He named his company “The Boswell Group” after his Jack Russell terrier “Boswell”. The group advises institutions and companies in several industries, and as of 2014 had consultants in New York City, Boston, Philadelphia and San Francisco. Sulkowicz's clients have included the board of trustees of Cooper Union. He has been widely cited as an authority on business psychology and the psychology of leadership, including in The Wall Street Journal, The Washington Post and The New York Times.

In addition to his work with the Boswell Group, Sulkowicz is a clinical professor of psychiatry at NYU Langone Medical Center. He is a former head of the Public Information Committee of the American Psychoanalytic Association. He is a former chair of the board of Physicians for Human Rights. He sits on the advisory council of Acumen, and the board of the Lucy Daniels Foundation.

After 9/11 Sulkowicz became known for his work as a volunteer counselor at a crisis center for Cantor Fitzgerald, a financial services firm that lost over two-thirds of its employees in the attacks.

Sulkowicz has published several articles in scholarly journals, including Harvard Business Review. Until 2006 he wrote a regular column, "Analyze This," for BusinessWeek. He has also written "The Corporate Shrink" column for Fast Company magazine.

Dr. Sulkowicz is President-elect of the American Psychoanalytic Association.

Personal life 
Sulkowicz lives in New York City and has two adult daughters, Emma and Olivia. One daughter, performance artist Emma Sulkowicz, is known for Mattress Performance (Carry That Weight) (2014–2015), which protested Columbia University's sexual assault complaints procedure.

References

Further reading
 

1958 births
American psychiatrists
American consultants
Harvard University alumni
Living people
New York University faculty
People from Dallas
American psychoanalysts
University of Texas Medical Branch alumni
St. Mark's School (Texas) alumni